Sobia Shahid is a Pakistani politician who has been a Member of the Provincial Assembly of Khyber Pakhtunkhwa, since May 2013.

Education
She has a master's degree.

Political career

Shahid was elected to the Provincial Assembly of Khyber Pakhtunkhwa as a candidate of Pakistan Muslim League (N) (PML-N) on a reserved seat for women in 2013 Pakistani general election.

In 2015, Shahid was noted as the most active woman member in the Khyber Pakhtunkhwa Assembly. In May 2016, she joined a resolution to establish a Women's Caucus in the Provincial Assembly of Khyber Pakhtunkhwa.

Shahid was re-elected to the Provincial Assembly of Khyber Pakhtunkhwa as a candidate of PML-N on a reserved seat for women in 2018 Pakistani general election.

Personal life
Shahid is married and as of 2005, has three children.

References

Living people
21st-century Pakistani women politicians
Pakistan Muslim League (N) MPAs (Khyber Pakhtunkhwa)
Year of birth missing (living people)